Corsano is a town and comune in the province of Lecce in the Apulia region of south-east Italy.

Geography
It is located on the last slopes of the Salentine Murge, facing the Adriatic Sea coast.

History
Corsano was most likely founded in the 8th century, during the Byzantine domination of southern Italy, by Basilian monks. Later it was part of the Principality of Taranto, a semi-independent entity of the Kingdom of Naples, and later was held by numerous feudal families.

The most striking sight is the baronial Castle (17th century) and Julien's face.

References

Cities and towns in Apulia
Localities of Salento
Castles in Italy